John M. Longo Ph.D, CFA is an American investment strategist, portfolio manager, educator, editor, speaker and author.

Academic background
Longo is a clinical professor of finance at Rutgers Business School and has taught in their undergraduate, MBA, Executive MBA, and International Executive MBA programs for more than fifteen years. He is also a visiting professor of finance at Global EMBA, the joint international Executive MBA Program of Columbia University, London Business School and The University of Hong Kong. He received his PhD/MBA in finance from Rutgers University in 1995.

Rutgers lists the following as his areas of expertise:
 Hedge funds
 Behavioral finance
 Investor psychology
 Investment strategy
 Portfolio management
 Stock markets
 Valuation
 Trading
 Artificial intelligence
 High-net-worth investors
 Financial planning

Work history
Longo is chief investment officer and portfolio manager at Beacon Trust, a registered investment advisor with approximately $2.5 billion in assets under management.  Beacon Trust is a unit of Provident Financial Services (NYSE:PFS), founded in 1839. Longo previously was the chair of the investment committee and chief investment officer at The MDE Group, a New Jersey-based wealth management firm with more than $1.3 billion in assets under management. He also co-authors many of the firms white papers and speaks on behalf of the firm around the country. Previously, Longo was a vice president at Merrill Lynch & Co., Inc. where he created and managed investment strategies for Merrill Lynch's Strategy Power product.

Acertus Capital Management (formerly Risk 3.0 Asset Management)
Longo was integral in the development of The MDE Group's Risk 3.0 approach to investing. Risk 3.0 was launched as a “risk-centric approach to investing that … addresses the current challenging investment environment.” The MDE Group's investment strategies were subsequently covered in the Wall Street Journal in an article titled “A Focus on Preservation.” 

Longo also aided MDE CEO Mitchell Eichen in the launch of Acertus Capital Management as a platform of investment solutions for other advisors. He served as a portfolio manager and chief investment officer of the firm. These solutions include planned return strategy, accelerated return strategy and third rail strategy.

Editorial work and authorship
Longo is a member of the editorial board of The Journal of Performance Measurement and has written several articles for the Journal of Financial Planning, including “The Future of Hedge Funds: Five Emerging Trends”  and “The Future of Wealth Management: Incorporating Behavioral Finance into Your Practice.”  He is also the author/editor of Hedge Fund Alpha: A Framework for Generating and Understanding Investment Performance, which was published in March 2009. The book focuses on generating and understanding investment performance for hedge funds and examines the emerging markets of Brazil, Russia, India and China.

In 2011, Longo was named to the advisory board of the Bloomberg Institute to aid in the development of the new Bloomberg Aptitude Test

In 2016, Longo created The Art of Investing: Lesson's From History's Greatest Traders for The Great Courses.

Appearances
Longo is frequently quoted in the financial media and has appeared on CNBC and Bloomberg Television.

Longo teaches a course for the Great Courses https://www.thegreatcourses.com/professors/john-m-longo/

References

Living people
American corporate directors
American finance and investment writers
American financial analysts
American hedge fund managers
American investment advisors
American money managers
CFA charterholders
Rutgers University faculty
Year of birth missing (living people)
Merrill (company) people